Wildenburg may refer to:

 Wildenburg Castle (Hunsrück), a ruined castle near Kempfeld, Hunsrück, Rhineland-Palatinate, Germany
 Wildenburg Castle (Eifel), castle near Hellenthal, Eifel, county of Euskirchen, North Rhine-Westphalia, Germany

See also
Wildenberg (disambiguation)
Wildburg (disambiguation)
Wildenburger Kopf, a mountain in the Hunsrück mountains near the village of Kempfeld